Preuss's cliff swallow (Petrochelidon preussi), also known as Preuss's swallow, is a species of bird in the family Hirundinidae.

Distribution and habitat
It is found in Benin, Burkina Faso, Cameroon, Central African Republic, Chad, Republic of the Congo, Ivory Coast, Equatorial Guinea, Ghana, Guinea, Guinea-Bissau, Mali, Niger, Nigeria, Sierra Leone, and Togo.

References

Preuss's cliff swallow
Birds of West Africa
Preuss's cliff swallow
Taxonomy articles created by Polbot